Lidia is a genus of Asian dwarf spiders that was first described by Michael I. Saaristo & Y. M. Marusik in 2004.  it contains only two species, both found in Kazakhstan and Kyrgyzstan: L. molesta and L. tarabaevi.

See also
 List of Linyphiidae species (I–P)

References

Araneomorphae genera
Linyphiidae